Bob, the Galactic Bum was a four-issue comic miniseries published by DC Comics in 1995. Written by Alan Grant and John Wagner and illustrated by Carlos Ezquerra, it was a science-fiction comedy about a vagrant called Bob and his sidekick, Buck Fifty. It also featured Lobo as a guest star.

Premise
Bob is a homeless con man travelling the galaxy with his hapless sidekick whom he routinely mistreats. When stumbling upon a lost prince, Bob attempts to take advantage of the situation while guiding the man home. Unfortunately, several hostile forces are also after the royal member.

Reprint

The series was reprinted (in black and white) over eight issues of the Judge Dredd Megazine in 2008 (issues 266–273). While the copyright for the story and the character Bob is owned by the series' creators, copyright for Lobo is owned by DC, and so in the reprint Lobo was replaced by a large butch lesbian called Asbo.

External links
Summary at Atomic Avenue.com

1995 comics debuts
Comics by Alan Grant (writer)
Comics by John Wagner
DC Comics titles
Lobo (DC Comics)